HMS Dasher was a  which served with the Royal Navy.  She was built by Yarrow Shipbuilders in 1895, served in home waters and was sold in 1911.

Construction and design
On 12 October 1893, the British Admiralty placed an order for three torpedo boat destroyers (Dasher and ) with the shipbuilder Yarrow under the 1893–1894 shipbuilding programme for the Royal Navy as a follow-on to the two prototype destroyers ( and ) ordered from Yarrows under the 1892–1893 programme.

As a torpedo boat, the planned armament was a single QF 12 pounder 12 cwt ( calibre) gun on a platform on the ship's conning tower (in practice the platform was also used as the ship's bridge), together with a secondary gun armament of three 6-pounder guns, and two 18 inch (450 mm) torpedo tubes. As a gunboat, one of the torpedo tubes could be removed to accommodate a further two six-pounders.

Displacement was  light and  full load. Two funnels were fitted.

Dasher was laid down at Yarrow's Poplar, London shipyard in December 1893 as Yard number 992 and was launched on 28 November 1894. She reached a speed of  during sea trials. She was completed in March 1896, at a cost of £40,890. Locomotive boilers were being made obsolete by water-tube boilers by the time of her completion, and she was refitted at Earle's Shipbuilding in 1899–1890 with water-tube boilers changing to a three-funneled configuration.

Service
In March 1901 she was commissioned at Chatham Dockyard to take her place in the Medway Instructional Flotilla. Early in the morning of 15 April 1901 the Chatham Flotilla left Portsmouth for Devonport. In heavy weather  had to stop to recover her cables, and then while trying to recover her position in front of Dasher, she smashed into the latter's port side creating a hole below waterline and damaging steering gear. Dasher was able to reach Swanage Bay where the destroyer was cleared of water and was then able to proceed to Portsmouth at 8 knots on 17 April. After arrival at Portsmouth, Dasher was ordered back to Chatham where she was docked and put out of commission.  was badly damaged in the collision too, and had to be put into Kimmeridge for repairs.  In July 1901, Dasher took part in that year's Naval Manoeuvres.

Dasher was re-commissioned by Lieutenant Harry Charles John Roberts West on 17 January 1902, still in the Medway flotilla, but two months later was transferred to the Devonport instructional flotilla, under the command of Lieutenant John Gilbert de Odingsells Coke from 18 March 1902. She took part in the fleet review held at Spithead on 16 August 1902 for the coronation of King Edward VII.

On 1 February 1909 Dasher ran aground on South Shoebury Sands, but was able to refloat herself and proceeded into Sheerness under her own power.

Dasher was sold for scrap to King and Sons on 14 May 1912.

Notes

Bibliography
 
 

 

Charger-class destroyers
Ships built in Poplar
1894 ships
A-class destroyers (1913)